Jonathan Oliveira da Silva (born 30 November 1989), known as Jô, is a Brazilian professional footballer who plays as a left winger for Cruzeiro-RS.

References

External links
 
 

1989 births
Living people
Footballers from Porto Alegre
Brazilian footballers
Brazilian expatriate footballers
Association football forwards
Esporte Clube Cruzeiro players
Vila Nova Futebol Clube players
Luverdense Esporte Clube players
Associação Chapecoense de Futebol players
Clube Esportivo Lajeadense players
Paulista Futebol Clube players
Paysandu Sport Club players
Esporte Clube São José players
Esporte Clube Juventude players
Londrina Esporte Clube players
Fortaleza Esporte Clube players
Santa Cruz Futebol Clube players
Esporte Clube Pelotas players
FC Metalist Kharkiv players
Joinville Esporte Clube players
Ukrainian First League players
Ukrainian Second League players
Campeonato Brasileiro Série B players
Campeonato Brasileiro Série C players
Campeonato Brasileiro Série D players
Expatriate footballers in Ukraine
Brazilian expatriate sportspeople in Ukraine